Lawson Bryan (June 13, 1950) is a United Methodist Bishop of the South Georgia Conference. He was elected July 13, 2016 to the episcopacy at the Southeastern Jurisdictional Conference quadrennial meeting at Lake Junaluska, N.C.

Biography

Education 
 Graduate of Dothan High School, 1968
 Bachelor of Science, cum laude, Tulane University, New Orleans, LA., 1972
 Master of Divinity, cum laude, Candler School of Theology, Emory University, Atlanta, GA, 1975
 Doctor of Ministry, Emory University, Atlanta, GA, 1985

Personal life 
Married to Sherrill O. Cooper. Together they have one child, Philip Bryan.

Published works
Pursuing Science, Finding Faith (2012) 978-0-9849426-0-2

Ordained Ministry 
Associate Pastor, Trinity UMC, Opelika, AL. 1975- 1976

Pastor, Hiland Park UMC, Panama City, FL. 1976-1980

Pastor, Dexter Avenue UMC, Montgomery, AL. 1980- 1986

Pastor, First UMC, Brewton, AL. 1986- 1990

Pastor, Ashland Place UMC, Mobile, AL. 1990-1997

Pastor, First UMC, Dothan, AL. 1997-2007

Senior Pastor, First UMC, Montgomery, AL 2007-2016

References

1950 births
American United Methodist bishops
Living people